Bidamin (also Romanized as Bīdamīn; also known as Qal‘eh Bīdemī, Qal‘eh-ye Bīdamī, and Qal‘eh-ye Bīdomī) is a village in Shahriari Rural District of Doab Samsami District, Kuhrang County, Chaharmahal and Bakhtiari province, Iran. At the 2006 census, its population was 183 in 40 households. The following census in 2011 counted 99 people in 25 households. The latest census in 2016 showed a population of 195 people in 53 households; it was the largest village in its rural district. The village is populated by Lurs.

References 

Kuhrang County

Populated places in Chaharmahal and Bakhtiari Province

Populated places in Kuhrang County

Luri settlements in Chaharmahal and Bakhtiari Province